Karcer is a Polish punk rock band playing since 1982.

Members

1982
Krzysztof Żeromski - guitar, vocals
Piotr Dudziński
Jarosław Jodłowski

1984
Krzysztof Żeromski - guitar, vocals
Dariusz Lewandowski - vocals
Dariusz Elwert - bass guitar
Wojciech Soboń - drums

1988
Krzysztof Żeromski - guitar, vocals
Dariusz Elwert - bass guitar
Paweł Wirkus - drums

1990
Krzysztof Żeromski - guitar, vocals
Przemysław Brosz - guitar
Adam Lao - bass guitar
Tomasz Fangrat - drums

2002
Krzysztof Żeromski - guitar, vocals
Adam Lao - bass guitar
Daniel Łukasik - drums

Discography
Karcer - 1987
Karcer - 1988
Turning to dust - 1990
Blindman - 1991
Karcer - 1991
Wschód jest pełen słońca - 1997
Nic nikomu o niczym - 2002
Anarchiva - 2007
Wariaci i geniusze - 2011

History
The band was founded in autumn 1982 in Słupsk. Its first live appearance took place on January 8, 1983, on elimination for youth festival. The band failed to advance to this festival due to problems with censorship.

In 1985, Karcer appeared on Jarocin Festival, and managed to play on the main stage. The same year, due to success at Jarocin, the band appeared on few other festivals. One year later in Jarocin, Karcer achieved position in top ten bands.

In 1991, the band realised its first record in Gdynia. The day after the recording Karcer left the country to play a tour in Switzerland.

After three years of concerting in London pubs, Wschód jest pełen słońca was released. The record was quite popular among Polish punk fans, and in 2002 it was re-released. In 2002, the album, Nic nikomu o niczym was released.

References
Band's official site
Jimmy Jazz Records

Polish punk rock groups
Musical groups established in 1982
1982 establishments in Poland